Hawthorn railway station is located on the Lilydale, Belgrave and Alamein lines in Victoria, Australia. It serves the eastern Melbourne suburb of Hawthorn, and it opened on 13 April 1861.

The station is listed on the Victorian Heritage Register.

History

Hawthorn station opened on 13 April 1861, when the railway line from Pic-nic was extended. When it opened, Hawthorn was a terminus, with a single platform (the current day Platform 1). In 1882, an additional platform was constructed, after the line was extended to Camberwell. In 1890, an island platform was constructed, using a canopy from the original Flinders Street station, for the newly opened, and now closed, branch line to Kew.

In 1963, a third line was provided between Hawthorn and Camberwell. In 1972, a third track was provided between Hawthorn and Burnley, which allows bi-directional usage of the centre track for express services during peak hour, and completed triplication of the line as far as Box Hill. A signal box at the station was also abolished in that same year.

In 1973, bulk briquette handling facilities were abolished at the station. In 1977, the goods yard was closed, with the siding and connection to the yard abolished in 1978.

By the mid 1980s, the station was in a dilapidated state, and had not been maintained for many years. In 1984, the Victorian State Government, with the Metropolitan Transit Authority (The Met), approved a $300,000 face-lift of the station. The face-lift included a repaint of the station, the re-panelling of the waiting room, re-cladding of the canopies and landscaping. The refurbishment was completed by May 1986.

Platforms and services

Hawthorn has one island platform with two faces and one side platform. It is serviced by Metro Trains' Lilydale, Belgrave and Alamein line services.

Platform 1:
  weekday all stations and limited express services to Flinders Street
  all stations and limited express services to Flinders Street
  all stations and limited express services to Flinders Street

Platform 2:
  all stations and limited express services to Lilydale
  all stations and limited express services to Belgrave

Platform 3:
  weekday all stations and limited express services to Lilydale; weekday all stations and limited express services to Blackburn
  weekday all stations and limited express services to Belgrave; weekday all stations and limited express services to Blackburn
  weekday all stations services to Alamein

Transport links

Dysons operates one route via Hawthorn station, under contract to Public Transport Victoria:
 : to Fairfield

Yarra Trams operates one route via Hawthorn station:
 : Vermont South – Central Pier (Docklands)

Gallery

References

External links

 Melway map at street-directory.com.au

Heritage-listed buildings in Melbourne
Listed railway stations in Australia
Railway stations in Australia opened in 1861
Railway stations in Melbourne
Railway stations in the City of Boroondara